Eupeodes volucris, the bird hover fly, is a species of syrphid fly in the family Syrphidae.

References

External links

 

Syrphini
Articles created by Qbugbot
Insects described in 1877